Ping on bun is a traditional Hong Kong food.

History

During the mid-Qing Dynasty, a pandemic spread through villages in Cheung Chau and caused a lot of deaths. As a result, villagers decided to gather before Pak Tai and pray, and later on were instructed to set up altars and say mass to scare the evil spirits away. Afterwards, islanders built temples to show gratitude to Pak Tai's blessings, viewing him as the guardian of the village.

As years went by, the annual Cheung Chau Bun Festival became a tradition. Villagers dressed up as gods to vanquish evil. The ping on bun was used to build the bun towers (three towers that stood 18 metres tall made of a huge number of buns) during the festival. Buns were to be distributed to the villagers after prayers and used to offer sacrifice to Gods and ghosts.

The villagers believed that eating hot ping on bun helps ward off disease, and that spreading powdered ping on buns in the sea can help to calm the ocean.

Ingredients

Ping on bun originated in Hong Kong. Its major ingredients include low-protein flour, lotus seed paste as well as sugar. It is best served hot or at room temperature. There are also some special flavours such as red and green bean.

Cultural influence

More than 48,000 tourists go to Cheung Chau during the bun festival.

The distribution of ping on buns outside the Pak Tai Temple attract a hundred people queuing from the morning. Guo Jin Kee, a shop selling Ping On Bun, sold more than 10,000 Ping On Buns a day while there were long queues outside the shop in the morning. Tourists have to wait for half an hour to buy fresh Ping On Buns.

Kwong Koon Wan, who earned more than $10,000 by selling a variety of ping on bun-themed souvenirs, said the bun cushions and fans were popular among tourists and expected that he could earn more than $30,000.

Social issue

Food safety
On 24 May 2015, Yee Ma Bakery on Sun Hing Street in Cheung Chau was found to sell ping on buns that contain the carcinogenic food dye ‘Red 2G’, which is a forbidden dye that cannot be used in the food producing process. The bakery was accused of violating the Food Safety Ordinance. Mr. Wan, owner of the shop, claimed that the same food dye was used for three years and the bun packages clearly list out the name as well as information of the agency and that the food dye is a legal product. Despite all the defences, they had no choice but to throw away hundreds of Ping On Buns, causing a large sum of material fees loss.

Food waste
As ping on bun is made by with fresh ingredients, it will spoil easily. During Cheung Chau Bun Festival 2015, nearly 10,000 buns spoiled.

Because of the heavy rain and the hot weather, the buns of the three bun mountain became moldy and even caused some sour smell and odours. There are thousands of bun pieces left on the ground during the festival. Originally, the Cheung Chau council managed to distribute all the buns of the bun mountains to the public. As the buns were spoilt, the Cheung Chau council obtained help from two bakeries and bought buns from all the bakeries from Cheung Chau directly in a bid to solving the problem.

The representative of Cheung Chau bakery Kam Kwok said that the rising cost of making the bun such as the rent, the cost of ingredients, the cost of packaging etc. has increased. Therefore, the price of the bun increased from $6 to $7.

References

Cantonese cuisine
Cheung Chau
Hong Kong breads